Atmeyan-e Vosta (also Romanized as Ātmeyān-e Vosţá; also known as Ātmeyān, Ātmeyān-e Vasaţ, Ātmīān, and Ātmīyān) is a village in Alan Baraghush Rural District, Mehraban District, Sarab County, East Azerbaijan Province, Iran. At the 2006 census, its population was 35, in 9 families.

References 

Populated places in Sarab County